BornholmerFærgen was a Danish ferry company which connected the island of Bornholm to Denmark, Sweden and Germany. Until 2011 the company was known as Bornholmstrafikken, when it became a subsidiary of Danske Færger. In 2018 Molslinjen took over the ferry service to Bornholm under the name Bornholmslinjen.

History
1866The Dampskibsselskabet på Bornholm af 1866 A/S was formed.

1963Car ferry Bornholmerpilen enters service.

1973Danish state takes control.

2000High speed catamaran Villum Clausen enters service.

2004Danish State puts Bornholm routes out to tender. Danish terminal moves from Copenhagen to Køge.

2005Bornholmstrafikken A/S is formed. New ROPAX vessels Hammerodde and Dueodde enter service.

2007Bornholmstrafikken A/S enters into a 50/50 collaboration with the Clipper Group A/S and establish Nordic Ferry Services A/S

2010The Hammerodde is rebuilt at STX Europe.  The Dueodde is sold to New Zealand ferry operator Strait Shipping (Bluebridge). Bornholmstrafikken re-brands as BornholmerFærgen.

2011High speed catamaran Leonora Christina enters service.

2016In 2016 Molslinjen won a 10-year public tender to operate ferry services to Bornholm, and operations started in September 2018 under the name "Bornholmslinjen".

Routes
BornholmerFærgen operate three routes from the island of Bornholm.

Fleet
BornholmerFærgen currently operates a fleet of three ships (one fast ferry and two conventional ferries). A second fast ferry joined the fleet in September 2011.

Current vessels

MS Povl AnkerThe Povl Anker was built at the Danish Aalborg Shipyard in 1978. She is the oldest vessel in the BornholmerFærgen fleet. The vessel is named after Paul Hansen Anker, who was vicar of Rutsker and Hasle and active in the rebellion against the Swedish government in 1658. BornholmerFærgen plan to keep her in service until 2017 as a reserve ferry. In October 2006, she served as backdrop Paprika Steen’s 2007 movie, With Your Permission. The Povl Anker was classified in 1978 as a I 3/3 E, Deep Sea Car Ferry, ICE II at Bureau Veritas, meaning that she is strengthened for navigation in ice.

Past vessels
MS Dueodde (2005-2010)Sister ship to the Hammerodde. Built in 2005 by Merwede. In September 2010 she was purchased by New Zealand ferry operator Strait Shipping (Bluebridge) and renamed  for service on Cook Strait.

MS Jens Kofod (1979-2005)Sister ship to Povl Anker. Sold to Eckerö Linjen in 2005 for service between Eckerö and Grisslehamn, The vessel was named after Jens Kofod Pedersen, who, like Paul Hansen Anker was active in the struggle against the Swedish government and was a cousin of Villum Clausen.

MS Peder Olsen (1991-1999)Built in 1974 as the Kalle III for Jydsk Færgefart A/S.  Sold to Moby Lines in 1999 for service in the Tyrrhenian Sea.

MS Rotna (1971-1978)Built in 1962 as the Kalle for Juelsminde-Kalundborg Linien.  Sold to Gozo Channel Line in 1978 for service in the Mediterranean. Broken up in 2002.

HSC Villum Clausen (2000-2017)(Launched: 2000) fast ferry (catamaran) Capacity approximately 215 cars and 1055 passengers requiring seats for all. Top speed 48 knots. Recorded in the Guinness Book of Records for its top speed and the longest distance in 24 hours of the voyage from the shipyard Austal Ships in Australia to Denmark. Villum Clausen was the brother of Jens Pedersen Kofod, and it was Villum Clausen, who shot the Swedish commander Johan Printzensköld who tried to escape arrest. Since 2017 as World Champion Jet for Seajets.

MS Hammerodde (2005-2018)Built at Merwede shipyard in the Netherlands in 2005. Capacity 1235 lane meters, 400 passengers, 108 berths in 60 cabins. Ice class 1C. The Hammerodde was rebuilt by the STX Europe shipyard in 2010 with an extra vehicle deck at the stern. Since 2018 as Stena Vinga for Stena Line.

References

Ferry companies of Denmark
Ferry companies of Sweden
Ferry companies of Poland
Companies based in Bornholm
Companies established in 1866
Danish companies established in 1866